Altemir Cordeiro Pessôa Neto (born May 16, 1994) commonly known as Neto Pessoa, is a Brazilian professional footballer who plays as a forward for Vila Nova in Campeonato Brasileiro Série B.

Club career

Plácido de Castro
Neto had his career started in 2012, in the Under-20 team of the countryside Plácido de Castro and with the ability to play in all positions of the attack soon was only one year in the base then in the state championship of 2013, he was already properly integrated into the professional team, under the command of coach Nilton Neri.

Rio Branco
Neto Pessoa, 19, was reintegrated into the Rio Branco squad to play in the Campeonato Acreano for the third time.

Andirá

Nacional de Muriaé
On December 4, 2015 Neto Pessoa was announced as reinforcement of the Nacional de Muriaé in the dispute of Module II of the Campeonato Mineiro.

Atlético Acreano

ABC
On October 16, 2018, ABC board confirmed neto's hiring for the 2019 season.

For ABC he who played 23 games and scored eight goals.

Náutico
On May 24, 2019 Timbu announced the signing of striker Neto Pessoa and on May 30 of the same month had his name published in the Daily Informative Bulletin (BID) of the  Brazilian Football Confederation (CBF). This means that he is regularized and can take the field for Náutico.

Ypiranga
Neto Pessôa was the third highest scorer in the C Series of the Brazilian Championship. In 21 games, he scored ten goals for Ypiranga, ending his run with 32 games and 13 goals for Canarinho.

Botafogo
On February 11, 2021, Botafogo-SP announced another signing for the season via email. The tricolor confirmed the arrival of striker Neto Pessôa, 26, who played for the 2020 season for Ypiranga-RS.

Already on August 8, 2021, Botafogo and Neto entered into an agreement and the player left the São Paulo club in his passage, he played 25 matches between the Paulista championship and Série C do Brasileiro. There were six goals scored, four for the national and two for the state. He was used a lot by Algiers in both competitions, but the information is that for private reasons he preferred to go to the North of the country, where he was born.

Remo
On September 9, 2021, Neto Pessoa was hired to be the new striker of Remo for the sequel to the Campeonato Brasileiro Série B.

On the night of October 21, 2021, Remo thrashed Galvez 9-0 at Baenão, in a match valid for the round of 16 of the Copa Verde. One of the highlights of the victory was striker Neto Pessoa, who started for the first time with the Lion's shirt and contributed three goals and two assists.

He ended his spell with the blue shirt and made 15 matches and scored 10 goals-nine in the Copa Verde alone. He ended the 2021 season as the Lion's top scorer.

Sabah
After an excellent stint at Remo, from Pará, where he was a key player in winning the unprecedented title of the Copa Verde in season 21, Neto Pessoa agreed, for a year, with Sabah, from Malaysia.

Vila Nova
Vila Nova Futebol Clube closed the signing of Neto Pessoa who was presented at the Club goiano on July 20, 2022, which is in the dispute of Campeonato Brasileiro Série B of the Brazilian football.

Honours
Plácido de Castro
Campeonato Acreano: 2013

Rio Branco
Campeonato Acreano: 2015

Náutico
Campeonato Brasileiro Série C: 2019

Remo
Copa Verde: 2021

References

External links
 

1994 births
Living people
Brazilian footballers
Association football forwards
Rio Branco Football Club players
ABC Futebol Clube players
Clube Náutico Capibaribe players
Ypiranga Futebol Clube players
Botafogo Futebol Clube (SP) players
Clube do Remo players
People from Rio Branco, Acre
Sportspeople from Acre (state)